Brooks Brothers is an American clothing retailer founded in 1818, the oldest apparel brand in continuous operation in the United States. Originally a family business, Brooks Brothers produces clothing for men, women and children, as well as home furnishings. Brooks Brothers licenses its name and branding to Luxottica for eyewear, Paris-based Interparfums for fragrances, and Turkey-based Turko Textiles for its home collection. 

As a result of store closures and poor online sales due to the COVID-19 pandemic, the company filed for bankruptcy protection in July 2020. Brooks Brothers announced in August 2020 that it would be purchased by Authentic Brands Group and by SPARC Group LLC (Simon Properties Authentic Retail Concepts Group LLC), a joint venture between Authentic Brands Group and Simon Property Group.

History

Founding and 19th century 
On April 7, 1818, at the age of 45, Henry Sands Brooks (1772–1833) opened H. & D. H. Brooks & Co. on the northeast corner of Catherine and Cherry streets in Manhattan. He proclaimed that his guiding principle was, "To make and deal only in merchandise of the finest body, to sell it at a fair profit, and to deal with people who seek and appreciate such merchandise." In 1833, his four sons, Elisha, Daniel, Edward, and John, inherited the family business and in 1850 renamed the company "Brooks Brothers."

The Golden Fleece symbol was adopted as the company's trademark in 1850. A wooly sheep suspended in a ribbon had long been a symbol of British woolen merchants. Dating from the fifteenth century, the image had been the emblem of the Knights of the Golden Fleece, founded by Philip the Good, Duke of Burgundy. In classical Greek mythology, a magical flying ram, or Golden Fleece, was sought by Jason and the Argonauts.

In its early history, Brooks Brothers was known for introducing the ready-to-wear suit to American customers. In the mid-nineteenth century, Brooks Brothers outfitted United States President Abraham Lincoln and considered him a loyal customer. At his second inauguration, Lincoln wore a coat specially crafted for him by Brooks Brothers. Hand-stitched into the coat's lining was a design featuring an eagle and the inscription, "One Country, One Destiny." He was wearing the coat and a Brooks Brothers suit when he was assassinated. As a supplier of soldiers' uniforms during the Civil War, Brooks Brothers became a target of outrage for its allegedly shoddy production. With a contract from New York State to supply uniforms for the New York Volunteers, Brooks Brothers took shredded and sometimes decaying rags, glued them together and stitched them into uniforms. They would fall apart in the rain and were the subject of ridicule from other regiments.

20th century 
The last member of the Brooks family to head the company was Winthrop Holly Brooks, who ran the company from 1935 until its sale in 1946, when the company was acquired by Julius Garfinckel & Co. Although Winthrop Brooks remained with the company as a figurehead after the acquisition, John C. Wood became the director of Brooks Brothers. Just prior to that, Wood had been the carrier of the papers for the Dumbarton Oaks Conference. Under the leadership of Wood, Brooks Brothers became even more traditional. Wood notably stated "They call us conservative, but we think that our styles are simply lacking the bizarre. We deal in what a man should wear, not what some women think he should wear."

By 1971, eleven Brooks Brothers stores were in operation and located in Manhattan, Chicago, Boston, San Francisco, Pittsburgh, Los Angeles, Atlanta, Washington, D.C., and St. Louis as an integral part of the retail conglomerate Garfinckel, Brooks Brothers, Miller & Rhoads, Inc., that held the company until 1981 when it was acquired by Allied Stores.

Ralph Lauren began his career as a salesman at the Brooks Brothers Madison Avenue store. Brooks Brothers later sued Polo Ralph Lauren to retain its rights to the original polo button-down collar shirt.

Brooks Brothers was acquired by the British firm Marks & Spencer in 1988. In the mid 1990s, the company's executives removed the signature Golden Fleece logo from the brand's cotton knit polo shirts, though it was later restored. 

In 2001, Marks & Spencer sold Brooks Brothers to Retail Brand Alliance ("RBA"), now known as The Brooks Brothers Group, a company privately owned by Italian billionaire Claudio del Vecchio (son of Luxottica founder Leonardo del Vecchio). Along with Brooks Brothers, RBA comprised Carolee, a designer of jewelry for department stores and specialty stores.  In 2007, RBA sold its high-end women's brand Adrienne Vittadini.

21st century
As of 2015, there were 210 Brooks Brothers stores in the United States and 70 in other countries, including Australia, India, Hong Kong, Taiwan, Korea, Japan, China, France, Spain, the United Kingdom, Chile, Canada, Panama, Italy, the Philippines, Poland, Mexico, UAE, Peru, Singapore, Switzerland, Indonesia, Malaysia, Greece, and Vietnam. In 1998, Brooks Brothers launched its official website. Headquartered on New York's Madison Avenue, United States flagship stores are in Manhattan, San Francisco, Chicago, Boston, and Beverly Hills.

Most of its clothing is now imported, but some suits, sport coats, shirts and accessories are manufactured in the United States. Many of its mid-range "1818" line of suits are manufactured at Brooks Brothers' Southwick plant in Haverhill, Massachusetts. All Brooks Brothers necktie silk is woven in England or Italy, and the ties still are "cut and piled" at the Brooks Brothers' tie factory in Long Island City, New York. Brooks also has a series of books on etiquette and manners for ladies and gentlemen. Its higher-end label is the Golden Fleece line which features suits that are tailored in the United States.

In September 2007, Brooks Brothers's then CEO, Claudio Del Vecchio, announced the unveiling of a high-end collection of men's and women's wear named Black Fleece. Del Vecchio announced that the first star guest designer for the new collection would be New York menswear designer Thom Browne. Black Fleece received so much critical and commercial success that Brooks Brothers opened a stand-alone Black Fleece boutique on Bleecker Street in the Winter of 2008. Brooks Brothers recently released a line of clothing catering to Asian clientele.

In 2008, the company began an extensive renovation of its flagship store at 346 Madison Avenue. In January 2009, Brooks Brothers closed a smaller location at Fifth Avenue and 53rd Street in Manhattan.  In 2020, the 365 Madison Avenue store closed.

In April 2010, Brooks Brothers launched a line of luxury home furnishings which includes bedding, bath towels, as well as living room décor and entertaining accessories.

Between 2017 and 2019, sales stagnated at around $1 billion due to business fashion turning more casual and online competition. This strain is due in part to changing market tastes, although the COVID-19 pandemic is a contributing factor. In May 2020, it was reported that Brooks Brothers was seeking a buyer. Reports also suggest the company was exploring a bankruptcy filing. In June, the company proposed closing its three American factories, “a dramatic move for a brand that has really hung their hat on ‘Made in America.” Del Vecchio, who was responsible for acquiring the factory in Massachusetts, said at the time that the U.S. factories never made any money and that the brand carried a debt of less than $300 million.

Bankruptcy filing and sale

On July 8, 2020, it was reported the company was filing for Chapter 11 bankruptcy due to declining sales and the economic impact of the COVID-19 pandemic. Brooks Brothers planned to close 51 of its 250 locations in North America.

On August 11, 2020, Brooks Brothers announced that it would be sold for $325 million to brand development firm Authentic Brands Group and to SPARC Group LLC, a joint venture between Authentic Brands Group and shopping mall operator Simon Property Group. The new owners committed to continue operating at least 125 Brooks Brothers retail locations in the US, and more worldwide (down from 424 global locations before the COVID-19 pandemic). The transaction was completed in September 2020. Ken Ohashi was also appointed as President and Chief Executive Officer in September 2020.

On December 1, 2020, designer Michael Bastian was named as the brand's creative director.

Innovations
Brooks Brothers introduced many clothing advances to the American market throughout its history as a leader in the American menswear industry:
 Ready-to-wear in 1849
 In 1896, John E. Brooks, the grandson of Henry Sands Brooks, applied button-down collars to dress shirts after having seen them on English polo players.
 English foulard ties, introduced by Francis G. Lloyd in the 1890s before he was made president of the corporation
 Ivy League American sack suit, 1895
 Pink dress shirt, became a sensation to go with charcoal-gray suits
 Shetland sweater, introduced in 1904
 Harris Tweed, introduced to the fashion marketplace in 1909
 Polo coat about 1910
 Madras, introduced from India via Brooks Brothers to the public in 1902
 Argyles socks: in 1957, Brooks Brothers became the first American retailer to manufacture the article for men
 Light-weight summer suits:  the first lightweight summer suits made of cotton corduroy and seersucker were introduced by Brooks during the early 1930s
 Wash-and-wear shirts: in 1953, the store pioneered the manufacture of wash-and-wear shirts using a blend of Dacron, polyester, and cotton that was invented by Ruth R. Benerito, which they called "Brooksweave"
 Non-iron 100% cotton dress shirt, 1998

Brooks Brothers did not make an off-the-rack black suit between 1865 and 2003. For many years, a myth circulated that the reason the company did not make black suits was out of deference to Abraham Lincoln, who wore a bespoke black Brooks frock coat, a gift from the company, when he was assassinated.  It is not clear if this policy was the result or cause of the traditional American fashion rule that black suits in daytime for men are proper only for servants and when honoring the deceased.

Notable customers

Sports
Brooks Brothers is a sponsor and the official suit designers and distributors of Italian football club Inter Milan. From 2010 to 2019, the company was a sponsor and official apparel supplier of the Head of the Charles Regatta.

Statesmen

United States
Brooks Brothers has outfitted every American president since James Madison, with the exceptions of Jimmy Carter and Ronald Reagan.

In 1865, President Abraham Lincoln wore a custom-made Brooks Brothers frock coat to his Second inauguration. Lincoln later wore the same frock coat on the evening of his assassination.

In the late nineteenth century, Brooks Brothers tailored uniforms for elite regiments of the New York National Guard, as well as uniforms for New York state troops and Union officers during the Civil War. Several Generals including Ulysses S. Grant, William Sherman, Joseph Hooker and Philip Sheridan purchased uniforms from Brooks Brothers.

In 1881, after becoming vice-president of the United States, Chester A. Arthur went on a Brooks Brothers shopping spree. Presidents Ulysses S. Grant, Woodrow Wilson, and Theodore Roosevelt all wore Brooks Brothers to their respective inaugurations as well.

In 1945, President Franklin D. Roosevelt wore Brooks Brothers while on his way to meet Joseph Stalin and Winston Churchill at the Yalta Conference. 

In 1963, President John F. Kennedy was wearing a Brooks Brothers’ grey suit when he was assassinated.

In 2009, President Barack Obama wore a Brooks Brothers coat, scarf, and gloves during his inauguration in 2009 (this coat was later re-worn by Obama to Trump's inauguration in 2017). In 2013, during his second inauguration, Obama wore a suit designed by Martin Greenfield, paired with a white shirt from Brooks Brothers.

In 2017, President Donald Trump was inaugurated in a grey suit, white shirt, and dark blue overcoat. The white shirt and overcoat were believed to have been designed by Brooks Brothers. Melania Trump and Ivanka Trump have also been seen wearing items of clothing from Brooks Brothers at times.

In 2021, President Joe Biden broke tradition by not wearing any items from Brooks Brothers at his inauguration, instead opting for a Ralph Lauren navy suit and winter overcoat.

France
French former president Jacques Chirac bought his shirts at the Madison shop.

Popular culture

Music and fine arts
Brooks Brothers is the official clothier of the Jazz at Lincoln Center Orchestra.

Andy Warhol was known to buy and wear clothes from Brooks Brothers. According to Carlton Walters: "I got to [know] Andy quite well, and he always looked bedraggled: always had his tie lopsided, as he didn't have time to tie it, and he never tied his shoe laces, and he even wore different colored socks, but he bought all of his clothes at Brooks Brothers."

Film, television, and theatre

The "white" shirts used for Archie Bunker's costumes in All in the Family were recut tan oxford shirts from Brooks Brothers.

Brooks Brothers supplied clothes for the television show Mad Men;  in October 2009, Brooks Brothers created a limited edition "Mad Men Edition" suit with the show's costume designer.

Stephen Colbert had all of his suits for The Colbert Report and The Late Show with Stephen Colbert supplied by Brooks Brothers.

Brooks Brothers frequently is sought out by costume designers in Hollywood, dressing stars in such films as Ben Affleck in Pearl Harbor, Gene Hackman in The Royal Tenenbaums, and Will Smith in Ali. The company produced made-to-measure period costumes for Denzel Washington's The Great Debaters.

George Clooney wears Brooks Brothers throughout the film Up in the Air, and scenes were shot in a Brooks Brothers airport store. The men of the film The Adjustment Bureau wear Brooks Brothers. In November 2011, Brooks Brothers announced that it had designed a custom wardrobe for Kermit the Frog for the movie The Muppets. The stars of Slumdog Millionaire were all dressed by Brooks Brothers for the 81st Academy Awards.

Brooks Brothers made all of the men's costumes, more than 500 pieces, for the 2013 adaptation of The Great Gatsby. They also sponsored the premieres in New York City and Cannes Film Festival. This was followed by a limited edition collection designed with Catherine Martin and sold at Brooks Brothers stores around the world.

In I Love Lucy, Brooks Brothers is referenced in "Changing the Boys' Wardrobe" (Season 3, Episode 9, 1953). The characters Ricky and Fred place their old clothes in Brooks Brothers boxes so their wives think they got new expensive clothing from Brooks Brothers.

Chuck Bass and Nate Archibald on the Gossip Girl TV series frequently wear clothes from Brooks Brothers.

Aziz Ansari's character Tom Haverford, on the NBC sitcom Parks and Recreation, frequently mentions buying clothes from the Brooks Brothers Boys collection because, as he says, "the cuts are slimmer, and it's cheaper. Win win."

Alec Baldwin's titular character in the 1994 film The Shadow was complimented on his Brooks Brothers tie by his adversary Shiwan Khan.  At their next meeting, Khan is dressed in Brooks Brothers clothing.

In Season 5 of Murder, She Wrote, main character Jessica Fletcher references Brooks Brothers suits.

In the song “I’ll know” from the stage musical Guys and Dolls, in response to Sgt Sarah Brown's musings about her ideal husband, Sky Masterson scoffs: “You have wished yourself a Scarsdale Galahad, the breakfast-eating, Brooks Brothers type”.

In the 2020 film Tenet, the protagonist played by John David Washington wore Brooks Brothers.

Fictional works 
The lead character Lestat de Lioncourt in Anne Rice's Vampire Chronicles often describes himself wearing suits by Brooks Brothers.

F. Scott Fitzgerald refers to Brooks Brothers clothing in his debut novel, This Side of Paradise.

Mary McCarthy's short story "The Man in the Brooks Brothers Shirt," which can be found in her collection The Company she keeps, 1942, is one of the more famous literary references to the Brooks Brothers.

Bret Easton Ellis refers to clothing from Brooks Brothers worn by Patrick Bateman and his colleagues in his controversial novel, American Psycho.

James Thurber refers to Brooks Brothers shirts in some of his short stories. Kurt Vonnegut also refers to a Brooks Brothers suit worn by the main character in his book, Jailbird.

Writers John O'Hara, Somerset Maugham and J. P. Marquand incorporated Brooks Brothers into their stories as a means to draw out character traits.

Richard Yates not only wore Brooks Brothers clothing throughout his life, but he often referred to the brand in his writing, including in A Good School, in which one of the characters tries to hang himself with a Brooks Brothers belt.

Novelist W.E.B. Griffin often mentioned Brooks Brothers military uniforms, Dress uniform and Dress Mess uniform in particular, in his best-selling Brotherhood of War and The Corps book series.

Writer Tom Wolfe makes repeated mentions of Brooks Brothers in his essays on style and status.

In Kathryn Stockett's novel The Help, Skeeter wears one of her father's Brooks Brothers shirts.

In the 2015 comic book Ms. Marvel #18 by Marvel Comics, the supervillain Kamran is derisively referred to by Kamala Khan's older brother, Aamir, as "that walking Brooks Brothers franchise."

See also
J. Press
Paul Stuart
Ralph Lauren
Izod
Thom Browne
Hickey Freeman
Joseph Abboud
Retail apocalypse
List of retailers affected by the retail apocalypse

References

External links

 

Clothing brands of the United States
Clothing retailers of the United States
American companies established in 1818
Clothing companies established in 1818
Retail companies established in 1818
Shops in New York City
Companies based in Manhattan
Privately held companies based in New York City
Suit makers
Luxury brands
Eyewear brands of the United States
1818 establishments in New York (state)
Companies that filed for Chapter 11 bankruptcy in 2020
1988 mergers and acquisitions
2001 mergers and acquisitions
Authentic Brands Group